Bulwell station, previously known as Bulwell Market station, is a railway station and tram stop in Bulwell, Nottingham, England. It is located on the Robin Hood Line and the Hucknall branch of the Nottingham Express Transit (NET).

History
Bulwell station opened on 2 October 1848, with the opening of the Midland Railway's line from Nottingham to Mansfield. It was the first of several stations to serve Bulwell, including Bulwell Common, Bulwell Forest and Basford and Bulwell. On 11 August 1952 it was renamed Bulwell Market, in order to distinguish it from the other Bulwell stations. It was closed to passenger traffic, along with all the other stations on the line, in 1964, but the railway line itself was retained for goods traffic. In 1993, this line was reopened by British Rail to passenger traffic as part of the new Robin Hood Line, and, on 24 May 1994, the station reopened under its original name, the other Bulwell stations having closed in the meantime.
 
In March 2004, the Nottingham Express Transit tram line opened on an alignment alongside the railway line. The station used to have 2 rail platforms, but the down platform was removed to make way for the Nottingham Express Transit tram stop.

The station used to have a PlusBus scheme where train and bus tickets could be bought together giving a saving on the cost of separate tickets. However this was withdrawn due to low usage. A Nottingham and Beeston Plusbus are still valid to Bulwell on buses and trams but cannot be bought for rail journeys starting/ending at Bulwell.

Services

Rail
The railway has a single line and platform through the station, with the platform on the opposite side of the railway track from the tram stop. A footbridge links the railway platform with the tram stop, town centre and bus station, crossing both railway and tram tracks. To the south of the station, the line becomes double-track for the rest of its run towards Nottingham. To the north, only a single track is used as far as Kirkby-in-Ashfield station. Train services are operated by East Midlands Railway.

On Sundays, the station is served by a two-hourly service between Nottingham and Mansfield Woodhouse, with no service to Worksop. Sunday services to Worksop are due to recommence at the station during the life of the East Midlands franchise.

Tram

The tram stop has an island platform, flanked by twin tram tracks. To the south the twin tracks continue to Highbury Vale tram stop and beyond, but to the north the line becomes single track as far as Bulwell Forest tram stop.

With the opening of NET's phase two, Bulwell is now on NET line 1, which runs from Hucknall through the city centre to Beeston and Chilwell. Trams run at frequencies that vary between 4 and 8 trams per hour, depending on the day and time of day.

Notes

References

External links

Transport in Nottingham
DfT Category F2 stations
Nottingham Express Transit stops
Railway stations in Nottinghamshire
Former Midland Railway stations
Railway stations in Great Britain opened in 1848
Railway stations in Great Britain closed in 1964
Beeching closures in England
Railway stations in Great Britain opened in 1994
Railway stations served by East Midlands Railway
Reopened railway stations in Great Britain